Trucksville is a census-designated place (CDP) in Kingston Township, Luzerne County, Pennsylvania, United States. The population was 2,152 at the 2010 census.

Geography
Trucksville is served by the Shavertown post office, with the zip code of 18708. 

The village is the site of the Lands at Hillside Farms, a popular small dairy store planned to expand into a major U.S. attraction the likes of Williamsburg, Virginia. The town has a volunteer fire department, a Methodist church, and a popular pizza place established in 1975. Trucksville is named for the town's founder, William Trucks (Trux), who operated a sawmill in the 19th century.

References

Census-designated places in Luzerne County, Pennsylvania
Census-designated places in Pennsylvania